Palpostoma is a genus of parasitic flies in the family Tachinidae. There are about 11 described species in Palpostoma.

Species
These 11 species belong to the genus Palpostoma:
 Palpostoma africanum (Verbeke, 1962)
 Palpostoma aldrichi Hardy, 1938
 Palpostoma apicale Malloch, 1927
 Palpostoma armiceps Malloch, 1931
 Palpostoma desvoidyi Aldrich, 1922
 Palpostoma incogruum (Walker, 1860)
 Palpostoma incongrua (Walker, 1860)
 Palpostoma laticorne (Verbeke, 1962)
 Palpostoma pilosum (Verbeke, 1962)
 Palpostoma subsessile Malloch, 1931
 Palpostoma testaceum Robineau-Desvoidy, 1830

References

Further reading

 
 
 
 

Tachinidae
Articles created by Qbugbot